Muhammad Ali and Joe Bugner fought two boxing matches with each other. Their first bout took place on 14 February 1973; and the second on 1 July 1975. Ali won both matches through unanimous decisions on points. The 1975 fight with Bugner was for the undisputed world Heavyweight title owned by Ali, it was held in Kuala Lumpur, Malaysia, making it the first and, as of 2021, only world Heavyweight title boxing fight held in that Asian country, and it was the last bout Ali fought before Ali's Thrilla in Manila, his third fight with arch-rival Joe Frazier.

References

Bugner
1973 in boxing
1975 in boxing
February 1973 sports events
July 1975 sports events in Asia